The cherry leaf miner bee (Andrena cerasifolii) is a species of miner bee in the family Andrenidae. Another common name for this species is cherry plum miner. It is found in Central America and North America.

References

Further reading

 
 
 

cerasifolii